The Kawaiisu language is a Uto-Aztecan language spoken by the Kawaiisu people of California.

Classification

Kawaiisu is a member of the Southern Numic division of the Uto-Aztecan language family.

Linguistic environment
The Kawaiisu homeland was bordered by speakers of non-Numic Uto-Aztecan languages: the Kitanemuk to the south spoke Takic, the Tubatulabal to the north spoke Tubatulabal, the Yokuts to the west were non-Uto-Aztecan. Because they shared the Southern Numic language, the Chemehuevi to the east are considered the closest relatives to Kawaiisu.

Geographic distribution 
The remaining Kawaiisu speakers live in the Tehachapi area of California.

Revitalization 
In 1994, the language was severely endangered, with perhaps fewer than 20 remaining speakers.

In 2011, The Kawaiisu Project received the Governor’s Historic Preservation Award for its efforts to document the Kaiwaiisu language and culture, including "the Handbook of the Kawaiisu, language teaching and the Kawaiisu Language and Cultural Center [and] the Kawaiisu exhibit at the Tehachapi Museum." As of 2012, the Kawaiisu Language and Cultural Center offers language classes and DVDs for home learning, as well as training for other groups seeking to create language learning programs and materials.

Morphology
Kawaiisu is an agglutinative language, in which words use suffix complexes for a variety of purposes with several morphemes strung together.

Sounds

Vowels
Kawaiisu has a typical Numic vowel inventory of six vowels.

Consonants
Kawaiisu has an atypical Numic consonant inventory in that many of the predictable consonant alternations in other Numic languages are no longer predictable in Kawaiisu. The Kawaiisu consonant inventory, therefore is much larger than the typical Numic language.

References

Footnotes

Sources

External links
 
 Kawaiisu lexicon
Kawaiisu language overview at the Survey of California and Other Indian Languages
 OLAC resources in and about the Kawaiisu language
 Sheldon and Carol Klein Papers on the Kawaiisu Language at the California Language Archive
 Sheldon Klein collection of Kawaiisu sound recordings  at the California Language Archive

Agglutinative languages
Numic languages
Indigenous languages of California
Indigenous languages of the North American Great Basin
Endangered Uto-Aztecan languages
Native American language revitalization